The 2018 Internazionali di Tennis Città di Vicenza was a professional tennis tournament played on clay courts. It was the fifth edition of the tournament which was part of the 2018 ATP Challenger Tour. It took place in Vicenza, Italy between 28 May and 3 June 2018.

Singles main-draw entrants

Seeds

 1 Rankings are as of 21 May 2018.

Other entrants
The following players received wildcards into the singles main draw:
  Liam Caruana
  Matteo Donati
  Gian Marco Moroni
  Stefano Travaglia

The following players received entry into the singles main draw as special exempts:
  Danilo Petrović
  Gianluigi Quinzi

The following players received entry from the qualifying draw:
  Martín Cuevas
  Gianluca Mager
  Marc Polmans
  Roberto Quiroz

The following player received entry as a lucky loser:
  Guilherme Clezar

Champions

Singles

 Hugo Dellien def.  Matteo Donati 6–4, 5–7, 6–4.

Doubles

 Ariel Behar /  Enrique López Pérez def.  Facundo Bagnis /  Fabrício Neis 6–2, 6–4.

References

Internazionali di Tennis Città di Vicenza
2018
Internazionali di Tennis Città di Vicenza